The Hong Kong Academy of the Humanities (HKAH) is a cross-institutional body of scholars in the humanities based in Hong Kong. The Academy was established in April 2011 with 39 foundation fellows drawn from Hong Kong's eight institutions of higher education funded by the University Grants Committee. Its constitution was promulgated at the 2012 AGM.

Goals
 To recognise scholarly achievement in the humanities in Hong Kong;
 To promote appreciation of the value of the humanities;
 To provide a platform for advocacy on behalf of the humanities to government, funding bodies, business and the general public;
 To provide a point of contact for government and international bodies seeking information about the humanities in Hong Kong.

Activities
 The HKAH has two book prize, The First Book Prize and The Martha Cheung Book Prize in Translation.

In 2015, the First Book Prize was won by Catherine Ladds of Hong Kong Baptist University for her book Empire Careers: Working for the Chinese Customs Service 1854–1949, published in 2014 by Manchester University Press. 
The runner up was Dennis Tay of Hong Kong Polytechnic University for his book Metaphor in Psychotherapy: A Descriptive and Prescriptive Analysis published in 2013 by John Benjamins.

The HKAH has held the following symposia:

 The Future of the Humanities and China, in conjunction with the University of Hong Kong in October 2011
 The Humanities and Public Discourse, in conjunction with Chinese University of Hong Kong November 2011 
 Søren Kierkegaard and Chinese Culture, in conjunction with Hong Kong Baptist University May 2013
 What Money Can't Buy—Professor Michael Sandel in conjunction with Chinese University of Hong Kong March 2016

Fellows
Fellows in the Hong Kong Academy of the Humanities are recognized by their peers as scholars of the highest academic distinction, or eminent practitioners of the arts, and honored for their lifetime contribution to the humanities. Early Career Fellows (previously referred to as Junior Fellows) are early to mid-career scholars who show exceptional promise in their humanities discipline. Overseas Fellows are Fellows who were formerly based in Hong Kong and have taken up posts abroad.

New Fellows are nominated on an annual basis by nomination and secret ballot of members.

Founding Secretary, Professor David Parker (1943–2015) of Chinese University of Hong Kong's Research Centre for Human Values, died on 29 October 2015 and served as Vice-President of the HKAH at the time.

Affiliations 
The Academy has sister relationships with other national academy bodies around the world, including the Union Académique Internationale and the Australian Academy of the Humanities.

References

External links
Official website
Official Twitter account

Other international scholarly academies 

 Australian Academy of the Humanities
 Academy of the Social Sciences in Australia
British Academy
Royal Society of Canada 
Royal Society of Edinburgh, Scotland
Royal Swedish Academy of Letters, History and Antiquities 

Education in Hong Kong